John Howarth may refer to:

 John Howarth (politician) (born 1958), British Labour Party politician and MEP
 John Howarth (cricketer) (born 1945), English county cricketer
 John Howarth (footballer) (1899–?), English footballer

See also
 John Haworth